Willye is a given name. Notable people with the name include:

Willye Dennis (1926–2012), American activist and politician
Willye White (1939–2007), American track and field athlete

See also
Willy, given name

Masculine given names